Novodonetske is an urban-type settlement in the Kramatorsk Raion, Donetsk Oblast (province) of eastern Ukraine.  It hosts the administration of Novodonetske settlement hromada, one of the hromadas of Ukraine. Prior to 2020, it was located in Dobropillia Municipality. The population is

Demographics
Native language as of the Ukrainian Census of 2001:
 Ukrainian 54.85%
 Russian 44.80%
 Belarusian 0.11%
 Moldovan (Romanian) 0.06%
 Armenian, Romani and Romanian (self-declared) 0.02%

People from Novodonetske 
 Ruslan Kisil (born 1991), Ukrainian footballer

References

 
Urban-type settlements in Kramatorsk Raion
Kramatorsk Raion